The Constitutional Council of Cambodia is a judicial body in the government of Cambodia. The council was established with the Constitution of Cambodia on September 24, 1993. The President of the Council is Im Chhun Lim.

Composition
According to Article 92/Chapter XII of the Constitution of Cambodia, and the Law on the Organization and Functioning of the Constitutional Council, the council consists of 9 members.
 The King of Cambodia appoints three members by royal decree.
 The Supreme Council of the Magistracy elects three members and is later appointed by the King through royal decree.
 The National Assembly elects three members and is later appointed by the King through royal decree.

References

External links

Government of Cambodia
Politics of Cambodia